Aaron Wise (born June 21, 1996) is an American professional golfer who plays on the PGA Tour. In 2018 he earned his inaugural win on the PGA Tour at the AT&T Byron Nelson and was named the 2018 Rookie of the Year.

Amateur career
Born in Cape Town, South Africa, Wise moved to the U.S. with his family when he was three. Raised in Lake Elsinore, California, he attended Santiago High School in Corona and graduated  Highly recruited, he chose to play college golf at the University of Oregon in Eugene, where he helped the host Ducks win the NCAA title in 2016, and also won the NCAA individual

Professional career
After two years at Oregon, Wise turned professional after the NCAA championship. He made his professional debut after qualifying for the U.S. Open, also his first major championship appearance. He missed the cut after shooting rounds of 74-76. In his third start as a professional, he won the Syncrude Oil Country Championship on the PGA Tour Canada. He finished fourth on the Order of Merit and earned a Web.com Tour card for the 2017 season.

On June 18, 2017, Wise won the Air Capital Classic in Wichita, Kansas, five strokes ahead of runner-up Beau Hossler. This win allowed him to earn a PGA Tour card for the 2018 season; he finished 18th on the Web.com regular season money list and was promoted.

At age 21 in May 2018, Wise gained his first PGA Tour win at the AT&T Byron Nelson in Texas; it was his 18th start as a member of the tour. He shot a final round 65 for 261 (−23) at the new Trinity Forest Golf Club in Dallas, three strokes ahead of runner-up Marc Leishman, a co-leader after  The win moved Wise from 99th to a career-best 66th in the world rankings. Wise won the 2018 PGA Tour Rookie of the Year award.

Amateur wins
2014 San Diego Junior Amateur, Inland Empire Amateur, Ka'anapali Collegiate Classic
2015 Desert Mountain Intercollegiate, Pacific Coast Amateur
2016 Amer Ari Invitational, Australian Master of the Amateurs, NCAA Division I Men's Golf Championship

Professional wins (3)

PGA Tour wins (1)

Web.com Tour wins (1)

PGA Tour Canada wins (1)

Results in major championships
Results not in chronological order in 2020.

CUT = missed the half-way cut
"T" = tied
NT = No tournament due to COVID-19 pandemic

Summary

Most consecutive cuts made – 8 (2019 Masters – 2022 Open Championship, current)
Longest streak of top-10s – n/a

Results in The Players Championship

CUT = missed the halfway cut
"T" indicates a tie for a place
C = Canceled after the first round due to the COVID-19 pandemic

Results in World Golf Championships

"T" = tied

See also
2017 Web.com Tour Finals graduates

References

External links
 
 
 University of Oregon Athletics – Aaron Wise

American male golfers
Oregon Ducks men's golfers
PGA Tour golfers
Korn Ferry Tour graduates
Golfers from California
Golfers from Nevada
Sportspeople from Cape Town
People from Lake Elsinore, California
Sportspeople from Las Vegas
1996 births
Living people